Joseph Gray may refer to:
 Joe Gray (actor) (1912–1971), American boxer, actor, and stuntman
 Joseph Gray (bishop) (1919–1999), Roman Catholic bishop of Shrewsbury
 Joseph Gray (painter) (1890–1963), British painter
 Joseph Gray (police officer), convicted of second-degree manslaughter for drunk driving
 Joseph Gray (runner) (born 1984), American runner
 Joseph Anthony Gray (1884–1966), U.S. Representative from Pennsylvania
 Joseph M. M. Gray (1877–1957), Methodist minister and Chancellor of American University
 Joe Gray (rugby union) (born 1988), English rugby union player
 Joe Gray Jr.